Neti Siddhartha, also known by its alternative title Siddhartha, is a  1990 Telugu-language action film produced and directed by Kranthi Kumar under the Kranthi Chitra banner. It stars Nagarjuna, Krishnam Raju, Shobana and Ayesha Jhulka (in she acting debut), with music composed by Laxmikant–Pyarelal. It is a remake of the Hindi film Dharmatma (1975), itself based on The Godfather. It did moderately well at the box office.

Plot
Siddhartha (Nagarjuna) is the son of K.P. (Krishnam Raju), a business magnate. Siddhartha comes back from the states after so many years. Jyothi (Shobana), his childhood friend, has an unrequited love for him. One day, he is told K.P. rules an underworld mafia syndicate by his friend David (Sarath Babu), whom K.P. then kills. Siddhartha leaves home and reaches a forest where he falls in love with a tribal girl, Basanti (Ayesha Jhulka). Meanwhile, syndicate members Jogendra (Tiger Prabhakar) and Shetty (Pradeep Shakthi) plan to kill K.P. and Siddhartha with the help of his son-in-law Chakravarthy (J. D. Chakravarthy), leading to K.P. and Basanti's deaths. Siddhartha returns to rule the syndicate, and takes revenge on his remaining enemies.

Cast

 Nagarjuna as Siddhartha
 Krishnam Raju as Krishna Prasad "K. P."
 Shobana as Jyothi
 Ayesha Jhulka as Basanthi
 J. D. Chakravarthy as Chakravarthy
 Kannada Prabhaakar as Joginder
 Sarath Babu as David
 Pradeep Shakthi as Shetty
 Devaraj as Bhillu
 Charu Haasan as Dr. Nidhi
 Thyagaraju as Commissioner
 P. L. Narayana as Viswam
 Suthivelu as Dingo Sab 
 Potti Prasad as Writer
 Vadivukkarasi as Bharathi
 Tara as Rekha
 Sri Lakshmi as Writer
 Rajyalakshmi as Sofi (David's wife)

Soundtrack 

The film's songs were composed by Laxmikant–Pyarelal, with lyrics by Veturi, and released by LEO Audio Company.

References

External links

1990 films
1990s Telugu-language films
Indian crime action films
Indian crime drama films
1990s crime action films
1990 crime drama films
Works based on The Godfather
Films scored by Laxmikant–Pyarelal
Telugu remakes of Hindi films
Films directed by Kranthi Kumar
Indian remakes of American films